Bruce Island is an island in Franz Josef Land, Russia.

This island was named after Henry Bruce, who succeeded the Earl of Northbrook as President of the Royal Geographical Society.

Geography
Except for a very small area at the western shoreline, Bruce Island is completely glacierized. Mys Pinegina is the headland on the eastern side.

The Miers Channel (Пролив Майерса) runs between Bruce Island and Northbrook Island. The sound running west of Bruce Island, separating it from Zemlya Georga, is known as the Nightingale Channel (Proliv Naytingeyl). To the southwest runs Bates Channel (Пролив Бейтса).

Adjacent Islands
Large swathes of the southwestern part of the island are unglacierized. This island was named by Benjamin Leigh Smith after his niece Amable Ludlow (1860–1939).
Ostrov Bell (Остров Белл; Bell Island) is a smaller non glacierized island lying off Mabel Island's southwestern shore, separated from it by a narrow sound which is only  in some places. Bell island is crescent shaped and it has a bay that opens to the west. Benjamin Leigh Smith named it thus because it looks like a bell. Bell was also the nickname of his sister Isabella.
Ostrov Uinduord (Остров Уиндуорд; Windward Island) is a small island lying close to Bruce Island's southeastern end. It was named by Frederick George Jackson, after his expedition's ship.

References

Islands of Franz Josef Land